Alvir (also Romanized as Alvīr; also known as Avīr) is a village in Alvir Rural District, Kharqan District, Zarandieh County, Markazi Province, Iran. At the 2006 census, its population was 435, in 167 families.

The population speaks the Alviri-Vidari language.

References 

Populated places in Zarandieh County